A list of films produced by the Tollywood (Bengali language film industry) based in Kolkata in the year 1989.

A-Z of films

References

External links
 Tollywood films of 1989 at the Internet Movie Database

1989
Bengali
Films, Bengali